Legs is a 1983 American made-for-television musical drama film starring Shanna Reed, Deborah Geffner, Lawrence Leritz, David Marshall Grant, Maureen Teefy, and Gwen Verdon.  It was directed by Jerrold Freedman and written by Freedman and Brian Garfield.   The film was retitled Rockettes for its UK video release.

This film was Gwen Verdon's television film debut  and using the talents of the 1982 Rockettes was partially filmed on stage at Radio City Music Hall.  The film had several public screenings there prior to its television release.

Plot

The film follows three women, Lisa Norwood, Terry Riga and Melissa Rizzo, who are auditioning in front of choreographer Maureen Comly, hoping to fill the one open spot in the chorus line of the famous US precision dance company, The Radio City Music Hall Rockettes.

Cast
 Shanna Reed as Lisa Norwood
 Deborah Geffner as Terry Riga
 Maureen Teefy as Melissa Rizzo
 Gwen Verdon as Maureen Comly
 David Marshall Grant as Sid Lewis
 John Heard as Dan Foster
 Sheree North as Ida
 Eileen Collins as Barbara
 Marilyn Cooper as Rita
 Lawrence L. Leritz as Radio City Music Hall New Yorker
 Ron Karabatsos as Mr. Rizzo
 Barton Heyman as Larry Clark
 Margery Nelson as Aunt Agnes
 Mace Barrett as Bob Schaeffer
 Jonathan Stockley as John
 Vera Lockwood as Mrs. Rizzo
 Carol Harbich as Paula
 Ethyl Will as Ethyl
 Robert King as Freddie Taylor

References

External links
 
 
 

1983 television films
1983 films
1980s musical drama films
ABC network original films
American musical drama films
Films scored by Lee Holdridge
Films directed by Jerrold Freedman
American drama television films
1980s English-language films
1980s American films